Heather Amanda Sutherland (born 1943) is an Australian historian and former professor at the Vrije Universiteit Amsterdam in the Netherlands. She specialised in the history of Indonesia, and also researched that of other Southeast Asian countries. She is the long-term partner of British actress Miriam Margolyes.

Biography 
Sutherland was born in 1943. She took up Asian studies at the Australian National University in Canberra, obtaining an M.A. in 1967. Her dissertation was on the literary intellectuals of Batavia, the capital of the Dutch East Indies. Her research about the Dutch history and visit to the Netherlands inspired her to work there for most of her later career. In 1970, she started her academic profession as a history teacher at the University of Malaya in Kuala Lumpur, Malaysia.

Learning of her research interest, Lance Castles from the University of Melbourne who had recently enrolled for Ph.D. under the supervision of Harry J. Benda at Yale University asked his supervisor to invite Sutherland to join their team. Under Benda, Sutherland earned her doctoral degree in 1973 on the thesis titled "Pangreh Pradja: Java's indigenous administrative corps and its role in the last decades of Dutch colonial rule." She continued teaching at the University of Malaya for one year.

In 1974, Sutherland joined the faculty of the Department of Cultural Anthropology and Non-Western Sociology at the Vrije Universiteit Amsterdam as a "lector" (equivalent to associate professor). She was officially inducted into the teaching position on 22 October 1976 as she delivered her inaugural lecture.

Sutherland met Miriam Margolyes in 1967 and they  have been partners since then. However, they do not live together and spend sporadic periods in London, Tuscany, and Australia. Margolyes described Sutherland as an "introvert" and the secret to their lasting relationship as "not living together."

Publications

Key research papers

Books 

 
 
 
 
  (with Gerrit Knaap)

Notes

References 

1943 births
Living people
Historians of Southeast Asia
Yale University alumni
Academic staff of Vrije Universiteit Amsterdam
Australian National University alumni
Australian lesbian writers